Rank SIFT algorithm is the revised SIFT (Scale-invariant feature transform) algorithm which uses ranking techniques to improve the performance of the SIFT algorithm. In fact, ranking techniques can be used in key point localization or descriptor generation of the original SIFT algorithm.

SIFT With Ranking Techniques

Ranking the Key Point
Ranking techniques can be used to keep certain number of key points which are detected by SIFT detector.

Suppose  is the feature descriptor of key point  defined above. Then the vector set  containing labeled elements can be used as a training set for the Ranking SVM problem.

The learning process can be represented as follows:

The obtained optimal  can be used to order the future key points.

Ranking the Elements of Descriptor

Ranking techniques also can be used to generate the key point descriptor.

After transforming original feature vector  to the ordinal descriptor , the difference between two ordinal descriptors can be evaluated in the following two measurements.

 The Spearman correlation coefficient
The Spearman correlation coefficient also refers to Spearman's rank correlation coefficient.

 The Kendall's Tau
The Kendall's Tau also refers to Kendall tau rank correlation coefficient.

References

Object recognition and categorization